Virgichneumon maculicauda is a species belonging to the family Ichneumonidae subfamily Ichneumoninae.

Distribution
This species is mainly found in Belgium, British Isles, Germany, Poland, France, Italy, Russia and Spain.

Description
Virgichneumon maculicauda has a black body and yellow-orange legs. On the tip of the abdomen, tergite 5 is stained with white spots (hence the species name maculicauda, meaning with spots on the tail).

Bibliography
Wesmael, C. (1845) Tentamen dispositionis methodicae. Ichneumonum Belgii., Nouveaux Memoires de l'Academie Royale des Sciences, des Lettres et Beaux-Arts de Belgique. 18(1944):1-239.
Perkins, J.F. (1953) Notes on British Ichneumonidae with descriptions of new species (Hym., Ichneumonidae)., Bulletin of the British Museum (Natural History), Entomology series. 3:103-176.

References

External links
 Fugleognatur.dk

Ichneumoninae
Insects described in 1953
Hymenoptera of Europe